Theophanes the Greek (sometimes "Feofan Grek" from the , Greek: Θεοφάνης; c. 1340 – c. 1410) was a Byzantine Greek artist and one of the greatest icon painters of Muscovite Russia, who influenced the 15th-century painting style of the Novgorod school and the subsequent Moscow school. He was noted as the teacher and mentor of the great Andrei Rublev.

Life and work
Theophanes was from  the capital of the Byzantine Empire, Constantinople. After studying art and philosophy at the University of Constantinople, he moved to Novgorod in 1370, and in 1395 to Moscow. His style is considered unsurpassed in expression achieved by almost mono-colored painting. Some of his contemporaries observed that he appeared to be "painting with a broom", in reference to the bold, broad execution in some of his finest frescos (see St. Makarios of Egypt), which are unique in the larger Byzantine tradition. Theophanes was described by the Muscovites as "learned in philosophy", a reflection on his broad education and erudition. A hint of this might be gathered from his panel icon of the Transfiguration of Jesus, where the arresting geometry and brilliance of the figure of Christ is balanced against the ordered disarray of the earthbound Apostles, strewn about doll-like in the uncreated Light of Mount Tabor. The balance of mathematical harmony in line and shape, wed to a master's use of an earthtone palette and precious gold leaf, evokes a spirituality that is immensely powerful, and speaks to the genius of this relatively unknown painter. According to a contemporary source Theophanes was also famous as a manuscript illuminator.

Gallery

Frescoes

Icons

Notable works

Frescos
Theophanes decorated in fresco the walls and ceilings of many churches including:
the Church of the Transfiguration on Ilin Street in Novgorod (1378)
the church of Nativity of Mary (1395) of the Moscow Kremlin together with Semen Chernij)
Archangel Cathedral of the Moscow Kremlin (1399)
The Cathedral of the Annunciation of the Moscow Kremlin (1405)

Icons
Although he created panel icons, works attributed to Theophanes have become a topic of intense academic debate based on historical evidence. Prior to this debate, he was traditionally considered the author of famous panel icons, notably:
Our Lady of the Don (1380?)
Dormition of the Virgin Mary (1392)
The Virgin Mary and John the Baptist from the iconostasis of the Cathedral of the Annunciation in the Moscow Kremlin (1405?)
The Transfiguration (1408)

See also
 List of Russian artists

External links

 The school of Theophanos the Greek in medieval Crimea

References

1340 births
1410 deaths
Russian painters
Russian male painters
Byzantine painters
Eastern Orthodox icons
People from medieval Novgorod
Greek painters
Greek artists
14th-century Greek painters
15th-century Greek painters
14th-century Greek people
15th-century Greek people
Constantinopolitan Greeks
People from Constantinople